John of Epiphania was a late sixth century Byzantine historian. 

John was born in Epiphania (modern Hama, Syria). He was a Christian and served as a legal counselor to the Patriarch of Antioch, Gregory (ca. 590). John was also a cousin of the church historian Evagrius Scholasticus.

John obviously received good training. In his role as legal adviser, he was a witness to the Persian king, Khosrau Parvez's retreat into Roman territory, and may have even met the king. Khosrau was restored to the Persian throne by the Roman emperor Maurice. John may have also visited Persia (cf. Fragment 1)

John wrote a history of the Byzantine-Persian wars; from the campaigns of Khosrau I against Justin II, to the flight of his grandson Khosrau II to the Byzantines. The work is lost, but a fragment is preserved. The history was used by Evagrius and Theophylact Simocatta. As with many other Byzantine works, it is written in an archaic form of Greek, meant to imitate the classical style (e.g. Thucidydes).

External links 

 Carl Müller: Fragmenta historicorum graecorum. Bd. 4. Paris 1851, pp. 272–276 (online).
 Translation of the fragment (Tertullian.org)

6th-century Byzantine historians
People from Hama